Women in (E)motion is a live album by American folk singer Odetta, released in 2002. It was recorded live for the Women In (E)motion Festival
in Bremen, Germany in 1990.

Track listing
All songs Traditional unless otherwise noted.
"Rambler and Gambler" – 3:12
"Before I Can Change My Clothes/Alabama Bound/Bo Weavil" – 8:20
"Ninehundred Miles/Going with the Chilly Winds/Don't Blow/Another" – 22:25
"Until It's Time for You to Go" (Buffy Sainte-Marie) – 2:50
"Carry It Home to Rosie" – 4:16
"Many of Miles" – 2:25
"Why Don't We Go" – 2:00
"Black Woman" – 3:49
"God's Gonna Cut You Down" – 2:35

Personnel
Odetta – vocals, guitar

Production notes
Engineered by Gerd Anders
Mastered by Bernd Steinwedel
Design by Ralf Wittke
Cover Photo by Franz Pusch

References

Odetta live albums
2002 live albums